Fernando García de Cortázar y Ruiz de Aguirre (4 September 1942 – 3 July 2022) was a Spanish priest and historian.

References

1942 births
2022 deaths
20th-century Spanish Jesuits
21st-century Spanish Jesuits
Spanish priests
Spanish historians
People from Bilbao
Corresponding members of the Real Academia de la Historia